Arielle Jacobs is an American singer and actress, mostly seen on stage in musicals. She is best known for her roles as Nina Rosario in the US Tour and Broadway productions of In the Heights and as Princess Jasmine in the Australian and Broadway productions of Aladdin.

Biography 
Jacobs was born in San Francisco to a Filipino mother and an American-Jewish father. She later moved to Half Moon Bay, California, and then to New York City. Her older brother, Adam Jacobs, is also a theatre performer.

Dancing since the age of three, she studied ballet, tap, and jazz. Jacobs' first time in front of an audience was at the age of seven, as a Christmas present in a school play. After moving to Princeton, New Jersey in her early teens, Jacobs attended Princeton High School, where she performed with the Princeton High School Choir. She graduated from New York University with a Bachelor of Music Degree in Vocal Performance.

She began studying voice at the San Francisco Conservatory of Music, and later at the Westminster Conservatory of Music. Her first taste of professional theatre came at the age of ten when she was cast in a new musical called Honor Song for Crazy Horse at the Mountain View Center for Performing Arts in California.

Jacobs takes an active interest in environmentalism and animal rights, and created an environmental website called "Help Heal the Earth" to teach kids about living an eco-friendly life. She also founded a non-profit organization called The Girls Camaraderie Project, which aims to inspire camaraderie among girls ages 10–13, and runs this organization with Broadway star Lexi Lawson (who played Eliza in the musical Hamilton).

Career 
She has starred in several Broadway shows. She played Jasmine in Disney's Aladdin on Broadway, after originating the role in the Australian Production in August 2016. Her Broadway debut was playing Nina Rosario in the closing cast of In The Heights, opposite creator Lin-Manuel Miranda. Other musical productions include Wicked on Broadway, as well as Rent, Disney's High School Musical, Shakespeare's Two Gentleman of Verona, and Into the Woods where she performed opposite Tituss Burgess. 

Off-Broadway, she has starred in two world-premiere plays by Nilo Cruz: Sotto Voce, and the one-woman show Farhad or the Secret of Being which was filmed for the Lincoln Center Public Library Archives. She performed in the Guggenheim Museum’s "Works & Process" series, singing songs from a new adaption of Georges Bizet's Carmen with the Tectonic Theater Project. In 2022, Jacobs reprised her role as Delilah in the off-Broadway premiere of Between the Lines based on the book of the same title by Jodi Picoult and Samantha Van Leer. The production recorded a cast album that was released in January 2023.

Recordings 
Her debut solo album A Leap in the Dark: Live at Feinstein's / 54 Below was released by Broadway Records in June 2018. It is a live recording of her autobiographical concert, telling the story of the most formative moments of her life.  It includes music by Celine Dion and Sarah McLachlan along with songs from many of the musical theater roles that she's played. Featuring Nicholas Christopher (Hamilton, Miss Saigon) and Javier Colon (The Voice season 1 winner).

Her voice is also featured on her brother Adam Jacobs debut solo album entitled Right Where I Belong, Daniel and Laura Curtis album Overture, as well as on both Carols For a Cure albums vol.17 and vol.21, and the Off-Broadway cast album of her solo performance in Inner Voice's Farhad or the Secret of Being.

Stage credits

References

External links
 
 
 
 
 

American stage actresses
Living people
People from Princeton, New Jersey
Princeton High School (New Jersey) alumni
Steinhardt School of Culture, Education, and Human Development alumni
20th-century American actresses
21st-century American actresses
American musical theatre actresses
Actresses from San Francisco
Actresses from New Jersey
American television actresses
American film actresses
American actresses of Filipino descent
People from Half Moon Bay, California
Year of birth missing (living people)